In 1235–1236, Mongol forces, unlike their first raid in 1221, appeared with the sole purpose of conquest and occupation of Kingdom of Georgia and easily overran the already devastated kingdom. Queen Rusudan fled to the security of western Georgia, while the nobles secluded themselves in their fortresses. Finally, in 1239, on Ivane I Jaqeli’s advice, Rusudan sent four envoys; her amirspasalar (commander-in-chief) and atabeg (tutor) Avag Mkhargrdzeli, the mandaturtukhutsesi (grand master of ceremonies) Shanshe Mkhargrdzeli, the msakhurtukhutsesi (majordomo) Vahram Gageli and Eristavi (duke) of Hereti Shota Kupri), to negotiate surrender to Chaghatai. The Mongol leader received the envoys graciously and released Georgian prisoners. 

To ensure her personal immunity, Rusudan set off with Arsen, bishop of Chqondidi and mtsignobartukhutsesi (chancellor), on the long trek to Batu Khan’s capital on the Volga and peace treaty was signed on following terms: 

 Georgian nobles would rank equally with the Mongol noyans (lords);  
 Georgia would lose its Muslim vassals (like Shirvan), but could keep its Christian (like Armenia) territory;
 Georgia would pay annual tribute of 50,000 Hyperpyron (about 250 kilos of gold) and additionally pay various taxes; 
 Georgia would provide soldiers for the Mongol army (Kheshig);
 David, Rusudan’s son, was recognized as Rusudan’s heir';

References 

Ceasefires
Mongol Empire
1230s treaties